Nathan Bizet (born 27 April 1997) is a French professional footballer who plays for Portuguese club U.D. Vilafranquense as a forward.

Career
Bizet started his career with Dijon FCO, playing four years with the reserve team and making his Ligue 2 debut in a 0–0 draw with Red Star on 18 December 2015. He moved to AJ Auxerre in 2017, and after a year with the reserve side, signed his first professional contract with the club. In June 2019 he moved to Championnat National side USL Dunkerque. In June 2020 he joined Red Star F.C.

References

External links
 

1997 births
Living people
French footballers
French expatriate footballers
Association football forwards
Footballers from Paris
Dijon FCO players
AJ Auxerre players
USL Dunkerque players
Red Star F.C. players
U.D. Vilafranquense players
Ligue 2 players
Championnat National players
Championnat National 3 players
Liga Portugal 2 players
Expatriate footballers in Portugal
French expatriate sportspeople in Portugal